Ana Bernardino is a Brazilian singer and one of two new singers in Brazilian Baile Funk band Bonde Do Rolê. She was added to the band after a talent search on MTV Brasil discovered her along with fellow new member, Laura Taylor.

References

1980s births
Living people
21st-century Brazilian singers
21st-century Brazilian women singers